The FMA AeT.1 was an airliner built in Argentina in the early 1930s.

Design and development
The AeT.1 was a low-wing cantilever monoplane of conventional design, with fixed tailwheel undercarriage. Only three examples were built, christened General San Martín, Deán Funes, and Jorge Newbery. These aircraft provided Argentina's first scheduled airline services with Aero-Argentina, flying between Córdoba and Buenos Aires. 

Air France director Colin Jeannel flew as a passenger on that flight.

Specifications

See also

References

1930s Argentine airliners
FMA aircraft